The bathtub curve is a particular shape of a failure rate graph. This graph is used in reliability engineering and deterioration modeling. The 'bathtub' refers to the shape of a line that curves up at both ends, similar in shape to a bathtub. The bathrub curve has 3 regions:

The first region has a decreasing failure rate due to early failures.
The middle region is a constant failure rate due to random failures.
The last region is an increasing failure rate due to wear-out failures.

Not all products exhibit a bathtub curve failure rate. A product is said to follow the bathtub curve if in the early life of a product, the failure rate decreases as defective products are identified and discarded, and early sources 
of potential failure such as manufacturing decfects or damage during transit are detected. In the mid-life of a product the failure rate is constant. In the later life of the product, the failure rate increases due to wearout. Many electronic consumer product life cycles follow the bathtub curve. It is difficult to know where a product is along the bathtub curve, or even if the bathtub curve is applicable to a certain product without large amounts of products in use and associated failure rate data.

If products are retired early or have decreased usage near their end of life, the product may show fewer failures per unit calendar time (but not per unit use time) than the bathtub curve predicts.

In reliability engineering, the cumulative distribution function corresponding to a bathtub curve may be analysed using a Weibull chart.

Hang Zhou, Ajith Kumar Parlikad, and Andrew Harrison from the University of Glasgow, University of Cambridge, and Rolls-Royce have demonstrated and mathematically proved that the wear-out stage of the 'bathtub curve' can be further brought to a higher dimension, and is developed into the concept of reliability surface, with its dimensionality reduction projection as the reliability contour map.

See also
Gompertz–Makeham law of mortality

References

Further reading

Reliability engineering
Engineering failures
Curves